This article includes the discography of Indian singer and composer Hariharan. Listed are all the albums and the notable film songs sung by him in order of their release. The discography consists of 27 studio albums, three live albums, five compilations, one film soundtrack and several film songs sung by him. Out of the 27 studio albums, 24 are solo albums and three are albums by the band Colonial Cousins, consisting Hariharan and Lesle Lewis.

Started his career in 1977, Hariharan established himself as a leading playback singer, and a ghazal singer and composer. In 1998, he with Lesle Lewis formed a band named Colonial Cousins. Within a span of few years, they became the pioneers of Indian pop music. They have 3 albums and a film soundtrack to their credit. They are indicated by "♦" in this discography.

Since the labels Magnasound and Bay Shore are now closed down and have not yet sold the rights of distribution, many of his albums are not available in stores and is declared unavailable in major music sales websites.

Studio albums

Live albums

Compilations

Songs

Duets

I

II

III

IV

V

VI

Hindi songs

Tamil songs

Telugu Songs

Kannada songs

Malayalam songs

Marathi songs

Bengali Songs

Odia Songs

Bhojpuri Songs

References

External links
 
 

Discographies of Indian artists